"Guilty of Love" is a song by the English hard rock band Whitesnake from their 1984 album Slide It In. Written by vocalist David Coverdale, he described the track as a "very simple and honest love song". It has frequently been compared to Thin Lizzy for its dual lead guitars.

Background
The song was released as the lead single from Slide It In in August 1983. Its release coincided with Whitesnake headlining the Monsters of Rock festival at Castle Donington, England. The B-side features the track "Gambler", also found on Slide It In. These are the only two officially released Whitesnake songs to be produced by Eddie Kramer. At the time, Kramer was producing Slide It In, but the band found it difficult adapting to his way of working, particularly his method of mixing the record. Kramer was eventually let go and replaced by Martin Birch, who had produced all of Whitesnake's previous albums. "Guilty of Love" reached number 31 on the UK Singles Chart. A music video was also shot at the Monsters of Rock show in August 1983.

Track listing

7" single (UK)
"Guilty of Love" - 3:18 (David Coverdale)
"Gambler" - 3:50 (Coverdale/Mel Galley)

Personnel

 David Coverdale – lead vocals, percussion
 Micky Moody – guitars
 Mel Galley – guitars, backing vocals
 Colin Hodgkinson – bass
 Cozy Powell – drums
 Jon Lord – keyboards
 Eddie Kramer – production

Charts

References

External links 

1983 singles
Whitesnake songs
Songs written by David Coverdale
1983 songs
Liberty Records singles
British hard rock songs
Song recordings produced by Eddie Kramer